Paget's disease may refer to several conditions described by Sir James Paget, surgeon and pathologist:
 Paget's disease of bone (most common use of the term "Paget's disease")
 Paget's disease of the breast
 Paget–Schroetter disease
 Paget's abscess
 Extramammary Paget's disease (EMPD)